Dejan Grabić (born 21 September 1980) is a Slovenian professional football manager and former player who is the head coach of Mura. Besides Slovenia, he has played in Austria, Cyprus, and Albania.

References

External links
Profile at NZS 
Profile at Soccerway

1980 births
Living people
Sportspeople from Novo Mesto
Slovenian footballers
Slovenia youth international footballers
Association football midfielders
Slovenian PrvaLiga players
Slovenian Second League players
Austrian Football Bundesliga players
Cypriot First Division players
Kategoria Superiore players
NK Olimpija Ljubljana (1945–2005) players
NK Ljubljana players
SW Bregenz players
NK Bela Krajina players
NK Domžale players
NK IB 1975 Ljubljana players
APOP Kinyras FC players
KF Skënderbeu Korçë players
NK Krka players
NK Bravo players
Slovenian expatriate footballers
Expatriate footballers in Austria
Expatriate footballers in Cyprus
Expatriate footballers in Albania
Slovenian expatriate sportspeople in Austria
Slovenian expatriate sportspeople in Cyprus
Slovenian expatriate sportspeople in Albania
Slovenian football managers